The 1947 season was the thirty-sixth season for Santos FC.

References

External links
Official Site 

Santos
1947
1947 in Brazilian football